Sebastián Báez was the defending champion but chose not to defend his title.

Jan Choinski won the title after defeating Juan Pablo Varillas 6–4, 6–4 in the final.

Seeds

Draw

Finals

Top half

Bottom half

References

External links
Main draw
Qualifying draw

Campeonato Internacional de Tênis de Campinas - 1
2022 Singles